The United States House of Representatives elections in California, 1906 was an election for California's delegation to the United States House of Representatives, which occurred as part of the general election of the House of Representatives on November 6, 1906. All eight districts remained Republican.

Overview

Results

District 1

District 2

District 3

District 4

District 5

District 6

District 7

District 8

See also 
60th United States Congress
Political party strength in California
Political party strength in U.S. states
United States House of Representatives elections, 1906

References 
California Elections Page
Office of the Clerk of the House of Representatives

External links 
California Legislative District Maps (1911-Present)
RAND California Election Returns: District Definitions

United States House of Representatives
1906
California